Oualidia ( l-walidiya) or Loualidia is a village in Morocco's Atlantic coast in the Casablanca-Settat region and at the border of Merrakch-Asfi. It is situated between El Jadida and Asfi and is located beside a protected natural lagoon and has been called Morocco's "oyster capital," a reference to the significant role shellfish harvesting plays in the local economy.

At the time of the 2004 census, the commune had a total population of 15,433 people living in 2668 households.

References

Populated places in Sidi Bennour Province
Phoenician colonies in Morocco
Rural communes of Casablanca-Settat